Movistar Team (Continental Team) (UCI Code MOT) was a Colombian UCI Continental cycling team.

History

Creation
The team was set up in time for the 2011 season with Movistar sponsoring both the Continental team and Spanish UCI Pro Tour team to race in events on the UCI America Tour as well as those national events within its region. The team is based in Bogotá, Colombia, and the management team is headed by former Colombian coach Libardo Leyton

On 2 June, the squad was presented officially and on 12 June and started the Tour of Colombia, where Byron Guamá achieved the first official victory for the team.

Disappearance of the continental team
In two years the squad ran 7 races out of Colombia, being three in 2011 (Tour of Venezuela, Vuelta a Chiriquí and Tour of Costa Rica) and four in 2012 (Vuelta al Táchira Vuelta del Uruguay, Classic International Tulcán y Vuelta al Mundo Maya). Although the team's goal was be part of the principal races of the Latin American calendar,  this could not be accomplished for different reasons;, organizational, logistical, legal as well as geographical. Therefore, on October 22, 2012, it was announced that the team would disband in 2013, with the last race that the team would participate in being the Vuelta al Mundo Maya.

After the disappearance announced in January 2013,  Movistar Colombia and Ecuador confirmed that they would unite forces to give continuity to the team but not linked to Movistar Team. With Bogotá as the team's headquarters and Libardo Leyton as general manager. The team was not registered with the UCI, becoming amateur and contesting races only in Colombia and Ecuador.

Resurgence of the continental team
For the 2015 season, the team now named Movistar Team, re-applied for UCI Continental status. with a roster of 10 cyclists, including the world champion para-cyclist Álvaro Galvis.

The team disbanded again after the 2017 season.

Doping
On 28 November 2017 news broke that Óscar Soliz had tested positive for CERA at the 2017 Vuelta a Colombia.

Team roster 
As of 26 December 2015.

Major wins 

2011
Stages 2b & 6 Vuelta a Colombia, Byron Guamá
Stage 11 Vuelta a Colombia, Fredy González
Stages 2, 8b, 11 & 12 Vuelta a Venezuela, Marvin Angarita
Stage  Vuelta a Venezuela, Marvin Angarita
Stages 5 (ITT) & 11 Vuelta Ciclista a Costa Rica, Gregory Brenes
Stage 12 Vuelta Ciclista a Costa Rica, Óscar Soliz
 National Time Trial Championships, Óscar Soliz
 Under-23 National Road Race Championships, Marvin Angarita
2012
Stage 8 Vuelta a Colombia, Byron Guamá
Stage 1 Vuelta Mundo Maya, Gregory Brenes
Stage 2 Vuelta Mundo Maya, Byron Guamá
Stage 3 Vuelta Mundo Maya, Alejandro Serna Toro
Stage 6 Vuelta Mundo Maya, Freddy Montaña
 National Time Trial Championships, Óscar Soliz
 National Time Trial Championships, Ramon Carretero
2013
Stages 2 & 10 Vuelta a Colombia, Byron Guamá
Stage 11 Vuelta a Colombia, Freddy Montaña
Bolivarian Games ITT, Brayan Ramírez
2014
Central American and Caribbean Games ITT, Brayan Ramírez
 National Time Trial Championships, Óscar Soliz
 National Road Race Championships, Óscar Soliz
2015
 National Time Trial Championships, Óscar Soliz
 National Road Race Championships, Óscar Soliz
2016
 National Under-23 Time Trial Championships, Carlos Ramírez
 National Time Trial Championships, Óscar Soliz
 National Road Race Championships, Óscar Soliz

National champions 

2011
 Bolivian Time Trial Championship, Óscar Soliz
 Colombian U23 Road Race Championship, Marvin Angarita 
2012
 Bolivian Time Trial Championship, Óscar Soliz
 Panamanian Time Trial Championship, Ramon Carretero
2014
 Bolivian Road Race Championship, Óscar Soliz
 Bolivian Time Trial Championship, Óscar Soliz
2015
 Bolivian Road Race Championship, Óscar Soliz
 Bolivian Time Trial Championship, Óscar Soliz
2016
 Bolivian Road Race Championship, Óscar Soliz
 Bolivian Time Trial Championship, Óscar Soliz
 Colombian U23 Time Trial Championship, Carlos Ramírez

References

External links 

Cycling teams based in Colombia
Cycling teams established in 2011
UCI Continental Teams (America)
Defunct cycling teams based in Colombia
Cycling teams disestablished in 2017